1996 Dakar Rally, also known as the 1996 Paris-Dakar Rally, was the 18th running of the Dakar Rally event. It began on 29 December 1995 with a prologue stage in Granada, Spain - the second successive year the event began away from the traditional starting point of Paris - and ended in the Senegalese capital of Dakar on 14 January 1996. Pierre Lartigue won the car class for the third year in succession for Citroën and Edi Orioli won his fourth motorcycle title for Yamaha. Viktor Moskovskikh secured the first trucks class title for the Russian Kamaz marque.

Stages

Final standings

Motorcycles

Cars

References

Dakar Rally
D
1996 in African sport
1996 in French motorsport